Gustavia superba is an understory tree that grows in Central and north-western South America.
Common names include membrillo, sachamango and heaven lotus. The trunk is around 5-10m high with the leaves radiating from the top (like palms).

Ecology
Gustavia superba grows naturally as an understory tree, where it is abundant, especially in secondary forests
. It appreciates abundant moisture, sun and well drained soil. It branches little until mature, and has a bunch of leaves at the top, so that it resembles a palm. Seeds are dispersed by agoutis. The leaves are a favourite food of iguanas.

Fruit
It bears rounded pear shaped fruit, on the trunk (cauliflorous). Inside the hard green shell are several large seeds about 4 cm in diameter. The yellowish-orange pulp is edible, is usually boiled after which it is said to resemble meat in taste. It is rich in A, B and C vitamins.

Distribution
The tree is not widely known outside its native range from Ecuador to Panama and Venezuela, but has been planted in tropical botanical gardens, including in Singapore (where it is referred to as 'pungol') and Australia.

References

superba
Flora of Panama
Flora of Colombia
Flora of Ecuador
Plants described in 1856